Christine Becker was a member of the first United States women's sabre team to ever win the World Championship title (2000).

Becker is a member of the U.S. National women's sabre team, and president of the Oregon Fencing Alliance. She is coached by U.S. National coach Ed Korfanty.

References 

American female sabre fencers
Sportspeople from Oregon
Living people
Year of birth missing (living people)
21st-century American women